Herman Frank (born 20 January 1959) is a German heavy metal guitarist best known for his work with Accept and Victory. In 2009, he released his first solo album called Loyal to None. Frank has also recorded with Hazzard, Sinner, Moon'Doc, Saeko, Thomsen and Poison Sun. As a record producer and engineer, he has worked for Saxon, Rose Tattoo, Crown of Creation, Molly Hatchet, Gutworm, and several others.

Musical career

With Accept 
Herman Frank joined Accept in 1982 shortly before the release of their album Restless and Wild. He replaced guitarist Jan Koemmet, who had been hired for Jörg Fischer but had left the band before the recording sessions. Frank himself departed after the release of the following (and the band's most successful) album, Balls to the Wall, in 1983.

When Accept reunited for festival appearances in 2005, it was with Herman Frank in the spot alongside constant presence Wolf Hoffmann. He was involved in the band's recent reunion and appeared on their 2010 album, Blood of the Nations, their first album in 14 years, and its follow-ups Stalingrad (2012) and Blind Rage (2014). On 28 December 2014, Frank announced that he had left Accept again.

Discography

Band albums 
Accept
 1982 – Restless and Wild (Credited but does not play on album)
 1983 – Balls to the Wall
 2010 – Blood of the Nations
 2012 – Stalingrad
 2014 – Blind Rage

Hazzard
 1983 – Hazzard

Sinner
 1985 – Touch of Sin

The Element
 1985 – Time

Victory
 1986 – Don't Get Mad ... Get Even
 1987 – Hungry Hearts
 1989 – Culture Killed the Native
 1990 – Temples of Gold
 1992 – You Bought It – You Name It
 2003 – Instinct
 2006 – Fuel to the Fire
 2011 – Don't Talk Science
 2021 – Gods of Tomorrow

Moon'Doc
 1995 – Moon'Doc
 1996 – Get Mooned
 2000 – Realm of Legends

:ja:Saeko
 2004 – Above Heaven, Below Heaven

Thomsen
 2009 – Let's Get Ruthless

Poison Sun
 2010 – Virtual Sin

Panzer
 2014 – Send Them All To Hell

Solo albums 
 2009 – Loyal to None
 2012 – Right in the Guts
 2016 – The Devil Rides Out
 2019 – Fight the Fear
 2021 – Two for a lie

Bibliography 
 Matthias Blazek: Das niedersächsische Bandkompendium 1963–2003 – Daten und Fakten von 100 Rockgruppen aus Niedersachsen. Celle 2006, pp. 148–149. .

References 

Encyclopaedia Metallum
Record sleeves and CD booklet liner notes for Balls to the Wall

External links 
Official website

German heavy metal guitarists
German male guitarists
Rhythm guitarists
Living people
Musicians from Hanover
Accept (band) members
Helloween members
1959 births
Sinner (band) members